Michal Áč (born 17 May 1985) is a Slovak football defender who is currently plays for FK Janíkovce.

References

External links

Futbalnet profile

1985 births
Living people
Slovak footballers
Association football defenders
FC Nitra players
FK Slovan Duslo Šaľa players
Slovak Super Liga players